Olha Nikolayenko (born 5 April 1983) is a Ukrainian handballer who plays for the Ukrainian national team.

She was listed among the top ten goalscorers at the 2009 World Women's Handball Championship in China, with 53 goals.

Achievements
Magyar Kupa:
Bronze Medalist: 2010

References

External links
 Olha Nikolayenko career statistics on Worldhandball.com

Living people
1983 births
Sportspeople from Kherson
Ukrainian female handball players
Expatriate handball players
Ukrainian expatriate sportspeople in Hungary
Ukrainian expatriate sportspeople in France
Békéscsabai Előre NKSE players
21st-century Ukrainian women